The 1986 Humboldt State Lumberjacks football team represented Humboldt State University during the 1986 NCAA Division II football season. Humboldt State competed in the Northern California Athletic Conference in 1986.

The 1986 Lumberjacks were led by first-year head coach Mike Dolby. They played home games at the Redwood Bowl in Arcata, California. Humboldt State finished with a record of two wins and nine losses (2–9, 0–5 NCAC). The Lumberjacks were outscored by their opponents 175–350 for the season.

Schedule

Notes

References

Humboldt State
Humboldt State Lumberjacks football seasons
Humboldt State Lumberjacks football